Thomas "Thomen" Stauch (born 11 March 1970), also known by his nickname The Omen, is a German heavy metal drummer, mostly known as the co-founder and former drummer of Blind Guardian.

Biography 

He began his career in 1984 the band Lucifer’s Heritage, playing drums on their 1985 demo, Symphonies of Doom. After changes in the line-up, the band renamed itself Blind Guardian in 1987. 

Stauch quit Blind Guardian in April 2005, citing dissatisfaction with the direction the band had taken in its latter years. 
His last releases with the band were the 2002 studio album A Night at the Opera and the live album Imaginations Through the Looking Glass.

In 2004, while still in Blind Guardian, he formed Savage Circus with friend Piet Sielck. Piet introduced him to Persuader vocalist Jens Carlsson and guitarist Emil Norberg, who completed the band's lineup. They released their debut album Dreamland Manor in August 2005. Due to health problems causing him to miss too many gigs, Thomen left the band on 17 August 2007 but came back to the line-up in 2012. Stauch also worked in other projects such as Iron Savior and Serious Black.

Stauch joined the band Seelenzorn in September 2008. He has also played drums for the band Coldseed with Soilwork frontman Björn Strid.

Stauch is known for his fast and technical drumming skill, especially on the Blind Guardian album A Night at the Opera, where he mixes the traditional intensity and speed of the band's older style, with new, more technical and progressive elements. He uses Premier Drums, Artisan Turk cymbals and Vic Firth drumsticks.

References 

German heavy metal drummers
Male drummers
German male musicians
Blind Guardian members
1970 births
Living people
Iron Savior members
Savage Circus members
21st-century drummers
21st-century German male musicians